was a Japanese architect and civil engineer, known for his PhD thesis on reinforced concrete frames, and for several concrete buildings. Abe was responsible for designing the first elevated railway using reinforced concrete. He contributed to many architectural and engineering works of the Hankyu Hanshin Toho Group.

Shortly after World War Two, he was the second president of the War Reconstruction Agency (currently the Ministry of Land, Infrastructure, Transport and Tourism) and the Secretary-General of the Construction Agency (Deputy Secretary of Construction) after the war. On March 4, 1947, he was appointed as a member of the Imperial House of Representatives, and remained in office until the abolition of the House of Peers on May 2, the same year.

Mikishi Abe was the student of A.N Talbot of United States. He is credited of spreading the Talbot's message of pragmatism in Japan.

Buildings 

 Seiko Main Office
 Hibiya Movie Theater, Yurakucho, Chiyodaku, Tokyo, 1934
 Meiji Seika Tobata Factory, Tobataku, KitaKyushu, 1936
 Hankyu Nishinomiya Stadium
 Kobe Hankyu Building
 Yuraku-za Theatre

Books 

 Analysis and Tests of Rigidly Connected Reinforced Concrete Frames.

References

Japanese architects
1883 births
1965 deaths